The 2004 World Series by Nissan was contested over 9 race weekends/18 rounds. In this one-make formula all drivers had to utilize Dallara chassis (Dallara SN01) and Nissan engines (Nissan VQ). 11 different teams and 31 different drivers competed. Heikki Kovalainen claimed the title for Pons Racing, finishing tenth in first race at Circuit Ricardo Tormo.

2004 Driver Lineup

Race calendar and results

Every second race saw a mandatory pit stop.

Driver standings
For every race the points were awarded: 15 points to the winner, 12 for runner-up, 10 for third place, 8 for fourth place, 6 for fifth place, winding down to 1 point for 10th place. Lower placed drivers did not award points. Additional points were awarded to the driver setting the fastest race lap (2 points). The best 14 race results count, but all additional points count.

Team Standings

References

External links
2004 World Series by Renault season info on Speedsport-Magazine.com

Renault Sport Series seasons
World Series by Nissan
World Series by Nissan